In mathematics, Malgrange–Zerner theorem (named for Bernard Malgrange and Martin Zerner) shows that a function on  allowing holomorphic extension in each variable separately can be extended, under certain conditions, to a function holomorphic in all variables jointly. This theorem can be seen as a generalization of Bochner's tube theorem to functions defined on tube-like domains whose base is not an open set.

Theorem Let

 

History
According to Henry Epstein, this theorem was proved first by Malgrange in 1961 (unpublished), then by Zerner  (as cited in ), and commmunicated to him privately. Epstein's lectures  contain the first published proof (attributed there to Broz, Epstein and Glaser).

References

Several complex variables